The Free Breakfast for School Children Program, or the People’s Free Food Program, was a community service program run by the Black Panther Party that focused on providing free breakfast for children before school. The program began in January 1969 at Father Earl A. Neil's St. Augustine's Episcopal Church, located in West Oakland, California and spread throughout the nation. This program was an early manifestation of the social mission envisioned by Black Panther Party founders Huey P. Newton and Bobby Seale along with their founding of the Oakland Community School, which provided high-level education to 150 children from impoverished urban neighborhoods. The breakfasts formed the core of what became known as the party's Survival Programs. Inspired by contemporary research about the essential role of breakfast for optimal schooling and the belief that alleviating hunger and poverty was necessary for Black liberation, the Panthers cooked and served food to the poor inner city youth of the area. The service created community centers in various cities for children and parents to simultaneously eat and learn more about black liberation and the Black Panther Party's efforts.

History 
The program was initiated in January 1969 at St. Augustine's Episcopal Church in West Oakland, California. Two months later, in March 1969, the Black Panther Party opened its second Free Breakfast Program for Children at the Sacred Heart Church in San Francisco, California. The program became so popular that by the end of the year, the Panthers set up kitchens in cities across the US, feeding over 10,000 children every day before they went to school. Between 1969 and 1971, at least 36 Free Breakfast for Kids programs were running nationwide.

The Free Breakfast Program quickly became the central organizing activity of the Black Panther Party. The reach and success of the program highlighted the inadequacies of the federal government's then-flagging and under-resourced lunch programs in public schools across the country. The program allowed the children of West Oakland's poor neighborhoods to eat a healthy nourishing meal in a safe, supportive environment before school, optimizing their ability to learn. The party used the program to educate children and their families about anti-capitalism, Black pride, and developing revolutionary consciousness. Many of these programs were held in predominantly Black neighborhoods but also served children of other ethnicities. The program was mainly run by volunteers—both party members and non-affiliated community members, most of them women. Those working closely in the program made sure that the free breakfasts were a concrete assistance to the city's poor communities. They also shaped the program to be a powerful symbol of racial injustice and ghetto marginalization in America by teaching liberation lessons while children ate their meal. Volunteers would start setting up and preparing food around 6 am, and served the meal from 7-8:30. Most programs took place in churches, schools, or community centers. A typical breakfast often included some combination of bacon, eggs, grits, hotcakes, toast, sausage, and a glass of juice or milk. Various chapters would also provide transportation for children, from home to the chapter's Free Breakfast site, then to school.

Oakland 
The Black Panther Party initially announced their intentions to begin the Free Breakfast for Children Program in September 1968 and the first program was officially launched at St. Augustine's Episcopal Church in Oakland in late January 1969. Parishioner Ruth Beckford-Smith was in charge of this first program.

Parishioner Ruth Beckford-Smith, working with Father Earl A. Neil, constructed a healthy menu that would nourish children and properly created a kitchen and dining hall that passed health inspections. The program's launch day served 11 children and gained popularity, as by the end of the week 135 children were being served daily at St. Augustine's Episcopal Church. The programs success influenced other chapters of the Black Panther Party, and soon the Free Breakfast Program was mandatory in all chapters nationwide.

Chicago
Fred Hampton, leader of the Chicago local, helped organize a number of community programs. These included five different breakfast programs on the West Side, a free medical center, a door to door program of health services (which offered testing for sickle cell anemia), and blood drives for the Cook County Hospital. The Chicago party also reached out to local gangs to clean up their acts, get them away from crime and bring them into the class war. The Party's efforts met with wide success, and Hampton's audiences and organized contingent grew by the day.

Women 
The Black Panther Party began as a predominantly male organization, but later grew to recruit large numbers of women. The Party recruited primarily women to staff the Free Breakfast for Children program. This often reinforced traditional gender norms, which gained push back from the Party's women in the effort to achieve gender equality. The Party's service programs were deeply gendered and often relied on women to fill service roles. The Free Breakfast program highlighted the gender struggles within the Black Panther program, as women were reinforced into maternal roles in the program’s kitchens and serving roles.

Demise

Despite its successes, federal authorities attempted to discredit and derail the Free Breakfast Program. Among other actions, authorities targeted the party with rumors of poisoned food and raided breakfast program locations while children were eating. The program gained FBI Director J. Edgar Hoover's attention because of its success in gaining the support of many black children and liberal whites. The FBI would view the program as threat because of its appearance "as a front for indoctrinating children with Panther propaganda" and FBI director Hoover wrote: "The [Program] represents the best and most influential activity going for the BPP and, as such, is potentially the greatest threat to efforts by authorities to neutralize the BPP and destroy what it stands for". As a result, many agencies, such as the police, FBI, and other federal agents, were documented to be a force in harassing and discrediting the program, the people it benefited, and the Black Panther Party organization. Police raids were documented at various program sites as an effort to end the Free Breakfast for Children program.

The US government later recognized the success of the program and would soon implement a national breakfast program of its own built on the framework of the Panthers' innovation.

Legacy 
The success of the Black Panther Party's Free Breakfast for Children program helped reduce hunger and food insecurity, while pressuring state and federal governments to expand their own services. The program showed how hunger could affect a child's ability to learn and advocated for the need of similar programs nationwide. The program showed the government's failure in the War on Poverty and their lack of support for addressing childhood hunger.

It would be a decade or more before free breakfasts would become almost universally available to poor children. In California, the party pushed Ronald Reagan's administration to create a state-wide free breakfast program, and while the federally funded School Breakfast Program was first piloted in 1966, congress only permanently authorized it in 1975.

Black Panther Party's Survival Programs 
The Free Breakfast for Children Program was one among more than 60 community social programs created by the Black Panther Party. They were renamed Survival Programs in 1971. These were operated by party members under the slogan "survival pending revolution". In addition to feeding school children, the party started People's Free Food Programs, delivering groceries, and encouraging community members to vote. 
 Following the creation of the breakfast program came the founding of Liberation Schools. The installment of the Intercommunal Youth Institute and the People's Free Medical Research Health Institute followed in 1970. The Sickle Cell Anemia Foundation, which provided free sickle cell anemia testing, came in 1971. Another Survival Program started by the Black Panther Party was referred to as "medical self-defense" with the creation of healthcare clinics and their own ambulance services. Other survival programs included children development center, free clothing, free busing to prisons, free housing cooperative, free ambulance, etc.

These programs had multiple goals including drawing community members to political rallies, dramatizing social inequalities, providing needed community services, and educating people in the ideas and program of the party. The Survival Programs solidified the Panthers standing in the larger community. The party's daily presence in the neighborhoods with breakfast, child care, and other programs changed the impression of the Panthers. They were seen as community leaders that actively worked to help the people around them.

See also
 The Black Panthers: Vanguard of the Revolution
 COINTELPRO
 List of breakfast topics
 Child Nutrition Act
 Food Justice Movement

Notes

References
 
 Pope, Ricky J., and 
 Shawn T. Flanigan. "Revolution for Breakfast: Intersections of Activism, Service, and Violence in the Black Panther Party's Community Service Programs." Social Justice Research, vol. 26, no. 4, Springer US, 2013, pp. 445–70, /s11211-013-0197-8.
 Hilliard, David. The Black Panther Party Service to the People Programs . University of New Mexico Press, 2008.
 Jeffries, Judson L. On the Ground: The Black Panther Party in Communities Across America. University Press of Mississippi, 2010.
 Potorti. Feeding the Revolution': The Black Panther Party, Hunger, and Community Survival." Journal of African American Studies., vol. 21, no. 1, Transaction Publishers,, 2017, pp. 85–110, doi:info:doi/.
 Lateef, Husain, and David Androff. Children Can't Learn on an Empty Stomach': The Black Panther Party's Free Breakfast Program." Journal of Sociology and Social Welfare, vol. 44, no. 4, Western Michigan University, School of Social Work, 2017, pp. 3–17.
 Bloom, Joshua,. Black against empire : the history and politics of the Black Panther Party. . .

Children's rights organizations in the United States
Hunger relief organizations
Child welfare activism
Free meals
Black Panther Party